Jordao Pattinama (born 1 March 1989 in Spijkenisse) is a Dutch footballer, currently playing for SV Deltasport Vlaardingen.

Statistics 

(As of 1 March 2009)

Personal life
He is the son of former footballer Ton Pattinama. His twin brother Edinho plays for NAC Breda.

References

1989 births
Living people
Dutch footballers
Feyenoord players
Excelsior Rotterdam players
Eredivisie players
Eerste Divisie players
Dutch people of Indonesian descent
Dutch people of Moluccan descent
Dutch twins
People from Spijkenisse
Twin sportspeople
SC Feyenoord players
Association football midfielders
Footballers from South Holland